Harro Ran (18 April 1937 – 10 March 1990) was a Dutch water polo player. He was part of the Dutch team that placed eighth at the 1960 Summer Olympics.

References

1937 births
1990 deaths
Dutch male water polo players
Olympic water polo players of the Netherlands
Water polo players at the 1960 Summer Olympics
Sportspeople from The Hague
20th-century Dutch people